The Rose Bowl was first televised in 1947 on W6XYZ, an experimental station out of Los Angeles that would eventually become KTLA.

Television

ESPN years (2011–present)

Beginning with the 2010 season, ESPN (majority-owned by ABC's parent company, The Walt Disney Company) now broadcasts all the BCS/CFP games, including the Rose Bowl game. The game is also broadcast nationally by ESPN Radio and by ESPN International for Latin America. In 2013, ESPN Deportes provided the first Spanish language telecast in the U.S. of the Rose Bowl Game.

The Rose Bowl game contract with ESPN was extended on June 28, 2012, to 2026, for a reportedly $80 million per year.

ABC years (1989–2010)

From 1989 to 2010, the game was broadcast on ABC, usually at 2 p.m. PST; the 2005 edition was the first one broadcast in HDTV. The first 9-year contract in 1988 started at about $11 million, which is what NBC had been paying. The 2002 Rose Bowl was the first broadcast not set at the traditional 2:00pm West Coast time. Beginning in 2007, FOX had the broadcast rights to the other Bowl Championship Series games, but the Rose Bowl, which negotiates its own television contract independent of the BCS, had agreed to keep the game on ABC.

NBC years (1952–88)

The 1952 Rose Bowl, on NBC, was the first national telecast of a college football game. The network broadcast both the Tournament of Roses Parade and the following game. The 1956 Rose Bowl has the highest TV rating of all college bowl games, watched by 41.1% of all people in the US with TV sets. The 1962 game was the first college football game broadcast in color. Television ratings for the Rose Bowl declined as the number of bowl games increased. The other bowl games also provided more compelling match-ups, with higher-ranked teams.  In 1988, NBC gave up the broadcast rights, as the television share dropped in 1987 below 20.

Radio

Notes
From 1962-1978, inclusive, NBC used the primary play-by-play voice for each school to call one half of the game while the other man did color analysis. At halftime, the two would switch roles. Where a team is listed in the color commentator column, we are trying to ascertain the name of the man who was the primary voice for that team for that year.

See also
Sports broadcasting contracts in the United States#College football
Bowl Championship Series on television and radio

References

External links
 Rose Bowl Numbers Game

 
Football on NBC
ABC Sports
ESPN announcers
Rose
Rose Bowl
Rose Bowl